Flora Zabelle (born Zabelle Mangasarian, April 1, 1880 – October 7, 1968) was a Broadway actress who appeared in several early silent films.

Early years
Zabelle was born in Constantinople, Ottoman Empire (now Istanbul, Turkey). Of Armenian descent, Flora Zabelle was born in the Ottoman Empire to Dr. M. M. Mangasarian. At the time of the Hamidian massacres, Dr. Mangasarian along with Flora moved to the United States. Her sister, Christine Mangasarian, was also an actress.

Career
In her Broadway debut in 1900, Zabelle portrayed Poppy in San Toy. In 1902, she appeared in the film King Dodo.

In 1920, she retired from the stage. About a decade later, she joined Jacques Bodart, Inc. as a designer and partner. In 1931, she left retirement to portray Mrs. Van Allen in the Broadway play The Man on Stilts.

Personal life 
She was married to Raymond Hitchcock from 1905 to his death in 1929. On October 7, 1968, she died in Presbyterian Hospital in New York City.

Selected filmography
A Village Scandal (1915)
The Ringtailed Rhinoceros (1915)
The Red Widow (1916)
A Perfect 36 (1918)

References

External links

1880 births
1968 deaths
American film actresses
American silent film actresses
American stage actresses
American people of Armenian descent
20th-century American actresses
Ethnic Armenian actresses
Emigrants from the Ottoman Empire to the United States
Broadway theatre people